Yellow Submarine (also known as The Beatles: Yellow Submarine) is a 1968 animated jukebox musical fantasy comedy adventure film inspired by the music of the Beatles, directed by animation producer George Dunning, and produced by United Artists and King Features Syndicate. Initial press reports stated that the Beatles themselves would provide their own character voices. However, aside from composing and performing the songs, the real Beatles participated only in the closing scene of the film, while their animated counterparts were voiced by other actors.

The film received widespread acclaim from critics and audiences alike, in contrast to the Beatles' previous film venture Magical Mystery Tour. Pixar co-founder and former chief creative officer John Lasseter has credited the film with generating wider interest in animation as a serious art form, it having been generally considered a children's medium at the time. Time commented that it "turned into a smash hit, delighting adolescents and aesthetes alike". Half a century after its release, it is still regarded as a landmark of animation.

Plot 
Pepperland is a cheerful, music-loving paradise under the sea, home to Sgt. Pepper's Lonely Hearts Club Band. The titular Yellow Submarine rests on an Aztec-like pyramid on a hill. At the edge of the land is a range of high blue mountains.

The land falls under a surprise attack from the music-hating Blue Meanies, who live beyond the mountains. The attack starts with a music-proof glass globe that imprisons the band. The Blue Meanies fire projectiles and drop apples (a reference to the Beatles' then-new company Apple Corps) that render Pepperland's residents immobile as statues, and drain the entire countryside of colour.

In the last minutes before his capture, Pepperland's elderly Lord Mayor sends Young Fred to get help. Fred takes off in the Yellow Submarine ("Yellow Submarine"). He travels to Liverpool ("Eleanor Rigby"), where he follows a depressed Ringo to "The Pier", a house-like building on the top of a hill, and persuades him to return to Pepperland with him. Ringo collects his mates John, George, and Paul. The four decide to help Old Fred, as they call him, and journey with him back to Pepperland in the submarine. As they operate the submarine, they sing "All Together Now", after which they pass through several regions on their way to Pepperland, including the Sea of Time, where time flows both forwards and backwards ("When I'm Sixty-Four"), the Sea of Science ("Only a Northern Song") and the Sea of Monsters, where Ringo is rescued from monsters after being ejected from the submarine. In the Sea of Nothing, the protagonists meet Jeremy Hillary Boob Ph.D., a short and studious creature ("Nowhere Man"). As they prepare to leave, Ringo feels sorry for the lonely Boob, and invites him to join them aboard the submarine. They arrive at the Foothills of the Headlands, where they are separated from the submarine and Old Fred ("Lucy in the Sky with Diamonds"). They then find themselves in the Sea of Holes, where Ringo picks up a hole and puts it in his pocket. Jeremy is kidnapped by a Blue Meanie, and the group finds their way to Pepperland.

Reuniting with Old Fred and reviving the Lord Mayor, they look upon the now-miserable, grey landscape. The Beatles dress up as Sgt. Pepper's Lonely Hearts Club Band and steal some instruments. The four rally the land to rebellion ("Sgt. Pepper's Lonely Hearts Club Band"). The Chief Blue Meanie retaliates by sending out the Dreadful Flying Glove, which John defeats by singing "All You Need Is Love". Pepperland is restored to colour as its flowers re-bloom and its residents revive. Ringo uses his hole to release the Lonely Hearts Club Band, and they join the Beatles in combating the Meanies' multi-headed dog ("Hey Bulldog"). Jeremy performs some "transformation magic" on the Chief Blue Meanie, causing the Meanie to bloom roses and sadly concede defeat. John extends an offer of friendship, and the Chief Blue Meanie has a change of heart and accepts. An enormous party ensues ("It's All Too Much").

The real Beatles then appear in live-action, and playfully show off souvenirs from the events of the film. George has the submarine's motor, Paul has "a little 'love'," and Ringo has "half a hole" in his pocket (having apparently given the other half to Jeremy). Ringo points out John looking through a telescope, which prompts Paul to ask what he sees. John replies that "newer and bluer Meanies have been sighted within the vicinity of this theatre" and claims "there is only one way to go out... Singing!" The four oblige with a short reprise of "All Together Now", which ends with translations of the song's title in various languages appearing in sequence on the screen.

Voice cast 
 John Clive as John Lennon
 Geoffrey Hughes as Paul McCartney
 Peter Batten as George Harrison (uncredited)
 Paul Angelis as Opening Narrator / Chief Blue Meanie / Ringo Starr / George Harrison (additional dialogue)
 Dick Emery as Max / Lord Mayor / Jeremy Hillary Boob
 Lance Percival as "Young/Old" Fred

Sources:Apple Corps, 2012.

Cast notes
 According to the special features section of the Yellow Submarine home media release, Peter Batten provided the voice of George for about the first half of the film. Before he finished recording for the film, he was discovered to be a deserter from the British Army of the Rhine in West Germany, and was arrested. His part was completed by Angelis, who was also the voice of Ringo and the Chief Blue Meanie.
 Percival also provided the voices of Paul and Ringo for the United States ABC TV cartoon series The Beatles.

Production

Development 
The Beatles were not enthusiastic about participating in a new motion picture, having been dissatisfied with their second feature film, Help! (1965), directed by Richard Lester. However, they saw an animated film as a favourable way to complete their commitment to United Artists for a third film. Many fans have assumed that the cartoon did not satisfy the contract, but Let It Be (1970) the film was not connected to the original three-picture deal.

The Beatles make a live-action cameo appearance in the final scene, which was filmed on 25 January 1968, shortly before the band's trip to India. This was done primarily to fulfill their contractual obligation to United Artists to actually appear in the film. The cameo was originally intended to feature a post-production psychedelic background and effects, but because of time and budget constraints, a blank, black background remained in the final film. While Starr and McCartney still looked the same as their animated counterparts, Lennon's and Harrison's physical appearances had changed by the time the cameo was shot. Both were clean-shaven, and Lennon had begun to grow his hair longer with accompanying mutton-chop sideburns.

The original story was written by Lee Minoff, based on the song by John Lennon and Paul McCartney, and the screenplay was penned by four collaborators including Erich Segal. George Harrison's character's recurring line "It's all in the mind" is taken from The Goon Show.

As with many motion-picture musicals, the music takes precedence over the actual plot, and most of the story is a series of set pieces designed to present Beatles music set to various images, in a form reminiscent of Walt Disney's Fantasia (and foreshadowing the rise of music videos and MTV thirteen years later). Nonetheless, the film still presents a modern-day fairy tale representing the values of its intended hippie audience.

The dialogue is littered with puns, double entendres and Beatles in-jokes. In the DVD commentary track, production supervisor John Coates states that many of these lines were written by Liverpudlian poet Roger McGough, though he received no credit in the film.

In the DVD commentary track, Coates states that the Meanies were always intended to be coloured blue. However, Millicent McMillan recalls that the Blue Meanies were originally supposed to be red, or even purple, but when Heinz Edelmann's assistant accidentally changed the colours, the film's characters took on a different meaning. Coates acknowledges in the commentary that the "Are you Bluish? You don't look Bluish" joke in the film is a pun on the then-contemporary expression "You don't look Jewish", but that it was not intended to be derogatory.

Animation 
The Beatles' animated personas were based on their appearance during the Sgt Pepper's press party at Brian Epstein's house, on 19 May 1967. The film also includes several references to songs not included in the soundtrack, including "A Day in the Life," the lyrics of which are referenced in the "Sea of Holes" scene; the orchestral breaks earlier in the film are also taken from the song.

American animators Robert Balser and Jack Stokes were hired as the film's animation directors. Charlie Jenkins, one of the film's key creative directors, was responsible for the entire "Eleanor Rigby" sequence, as well as the submarine journey from Liverpool, through London, to splashdown. Jenkins also was responsible for "Only a Northern Song" in the Sea of Science, plus much of the multi-image sequences. A large crew of skilled animators, including (in alphabetical order) Alan Ball, Ron Campbell, John Challis, Hester Coblentz, Geoff Collins, Rich Cox, Duane Crowther, Tony Cuthbert, Malcolm Draper, Paul Driessen, Cam Ford, Norm Drew, Tom Halley, Dick Horne, Arthur Humberstone, Dennis Hunt, Greg Irons, Dianne Jackson, Anne Jolliffe, Dave Livesey, Reg Lodge, Geoff Loynes, Lawrence Moorcroft, Ted Percival, Mike Pocock, Gerald Potterton, and Peter Tupy, were responsible for bringing the animated Beatles to life. The background work was executed by artists under the direction of Alison de Vere and Millicent McMillan, who were both background supervisors. Ted Lewis and Chris Miles were responsible for animation cleanup.

George Dunning, who also worked on the Beatles cartoon series, was the overall director for the film, supervising over 200 artists for 11 months. "Lucy in the Sky with Diamonds" was Dunning's idea, which he turned over to Bill Sewell, who delivered more than thirty minutes of rotoscoped images. By that time, Dunning was unavailable, and Bob Balser, with the help of Arne Gustafson, edited the material to its sequence length in the film.

The animation design of Yellow Submarine has sometimes been incorrectly attributed to famous psychedelic pop art artist of the era Peter Max, as his art style greatly resembles the style used in the film, but the film's art director was in fact Heinz Edelmann. Edelmann, along with such contemporaries as Milton Glaser and Seymour Chwast, pioneered the psychedelic style for which Max would later become famous, but according to Edelmann and producer Al Brodax, as quoted in the book Inside the Yellow Submarine by Hieronimus and Cortner, Max had nothing to do with the production of Yellow Submarine.
 
Edelmann's surreal visual style contrasts greatly with the efforts of Walt Disney Animation Studios and other animated Hollywood films that had been previously released at the time (a fact noted by Pauline Kael in her positive review of the film). The film uses a style of limited animation. It also paved the way for Terry Gilliam's animations for Do Not Adjust Your Set and Monty Python's Flying Circus (particularly the Eleanor Rigby sequence), as well as the Schoolhouse Rock vignettes for ABC and similar-looking animation in early seasons of Sesame Street and The Electric Company. (Only one of the animation staff of Yellow Submarine, Ron Campbell, contributed subsequent animation to Children's Television Workshop).

Music 
In addition to the 1966 title song "Yellow Submarine", several complete or excerpted songs, four previously unreleased, were used in the film. The songs included "All Together Now", "Eleanor Rigby", "It's All Too Much", "Baby, You're a Rich Man" (which had first appeared as the B-side to "All You Need Is Love" in June 1967), "Only a Northern Song" (originally recorded during sessions for Sgt. Pepper's Lonely Hearts Club Band) and "Hey Bulldog". Written by Lennon, this last track was cut from the film before it opened in the US. "Hey Bulldog" was restored for the US theatrical and home video reissue in 1999. The four new songs used on the soundtrack album were not considered of high enough quality for appearance on a "regular" Beatles album.

The film's instrumental music was an orchestral score composed and arranged by George Martin. One of the film's cues, heard after the main title credits, was originally recorded during sessions for "Good Night" (a track on The Beatles, also known as the "White Album") and would have been used as the introduction to Ringo Starr's White Album composition "Don't Pass Me By". The same cue was later released as "A Beginning" on the 1996 Beatles compilation Anthology 3.

Musical numbers 
 All tracks written by Lennon–McCartney except where noted.

 Track start and end time is indicated in hrs:mins:secs. These are approximated because the songs are embedded in the film plot and cannot be strictly separated.

 0:21–2:15: "Introduction Story" music by George Martin
 7:55–10:40: "Yellow Submarine"
 10:40–13:30: "Eleanor Rigby"
 19:00–19:55: "Love You To" (George Harrison) (excerpt, played during George's entrance)
 22:30–23:05: "A Day in the Life" (excerpt, orchestral swell, starting as the submarine takes off)
 23:25–25:55: "All Together Now"
 28:20–31:15: "When I'm Sixty-Four"
 31:30–34:30: "Only a Northern Song" (Harrison)
 43:15–46:15: "Nowhere Man"
 48:00–51:30: "Lucy in the Sky with Diamonds"
 54:30–54:50: "Yellow Submarine" (a short vocal excerpt when Ringo finds the green hole that leads to Pepperland)
 56:15–56:25: "Think for Yourself" (Harrison) (short excerpt, a line is sung a cappella to revive the Lord Mayor)
 1:06:35–1:08:50: "Sgt. Pepper's Lonely Hearts Club Band"
 1:08:50–1:09:05: "With a Little Help from My Friends" (short excerpt, directly following "Sgt. Pepper's Lonely Hearts Club Band" without interruption, just as on the 1967 album of the same name)
 1:11:45–1:15:05: "All You Need Is Love"
 1:16:30–1:16:40: "Baby, You're a Rich Man" (excerpt, played as Sgt. Pepper's Lonely Hearts Club Band are set free from the anti-music bubble; the recording of the song was expanded for the American version of the film)
 1:17:25–1:21:00: "Hey Bulldog" (originally shown only in Europe before the film's 1999 restoration)
 1:24:15–1:27:15: "It's All Too Much" (Harrison)
 1:27:15–1:29:00: "All Together Now" (accompanied by images of the real Beatles singing, numbers and letters, and "all together now" translated in various languages)

 First soundtrack album

The original soundtrack album comprised the four new Beatles songs, two other Beatles songs (the title song and "All You Need Is Love"), and orchestral pieces by George Martin.

The orchestral pieces were also used in the short NASA Apollo 9 mission films, which were part of the series that NASA made for every mission.

 Second soundtrack album

Another soundtrack was released in 1999 that contained all of the Beatles' songs from the film except "A Day in the Life".

Reception 
Yellow Submarine received widespread critical acclaim. Released in the midst of the psychedelic pop culture of the 1960s, the film drew in moviegoers both for its lush, wildly creative images and its soundtrack of Beatles songs. The film was distributed worldwide by United Artists in two versions. The version shown in Europe included an extra musical number, "Hey Bulldog", heard in the final third of the film. For release in the United States, the number was replaced with alternative animation because of time constraints. It was felt that, at the time, American audiences would grow tired from the length of the film.

The website's critical consensus states: "A joyful, phantasmagoric blend of colorful animation and the music of the Beatles, Yellow Submarine is delightful (and occasionally melancholy) family fare." On Metacritic, the film has a weighted average score of 78 out of 100, based on 17 critics, indicating "generally favourable reviews".

In a 1980 interview, John Lennon said of the film, "I think it's a great movie, it's my favourite Beatle movie. Sean loves it now, all the little children love it."

Rights and distribution 
Of all the Beatles films released by United Artists, Yellow Submarine had been the only one to which UA retained the rights, leading up to its purchase by Metro-Goldwyn-Mayer in 1981. In 2005, Sony Pictures Entertainment led a consortium that purchased MGM and UA. SPE handled theatrical distribution for MGM until 2012. 20th Century Fox Home Entertainment was responsible for home video distribution when the most recent home video release went out of print until 30 June 2020.

For the 50th anniversary of the movie in 2018, it was screened in the UK and Ireland for one day on 8 July 2018, and in the US from 8 July 2018. Amazon negotiated exclusive streaming rights to the film via its Prime Video service, starting 13 July 2018 in the UK, the US, Canada, Germany, Spain, France and Italy under a deal with Apple Corps. The companies declined to disclose the length of Amazon's exclusive rights.

Home media 
With the dawn of the home-video era came an opportunity to release Yellow Submarine on VHS and LaserDisc. However, it was held up by United Artists for some years over music-rights issues. Coinciding with the CD release of the soundtrack album, MGM/UA Home Video issued the film on home video on 28 August 1987. To the disappointment of fans in the UK, the film was presented in its US theatrical version, thereby omitting the "Hey Bulldog" scene. The video was discontinued around 1990, and for many years copies of the original VHS issue were considered collectables.

On 14 September 1999, then-rights holders Metro-Goldwyn-Mayer and Apple reissued the film for the first time on DVD and VHS using restoration techniques of the time. The sound was remixed to Dolby 5.1, and the film was re-edited to its European theatrical version, with the "Hey Bulldog" number restored. This version (released by MGM Home Entertainment, which was available exclusively through Warner Home Video worldwide) went out of print once the rights reverted to Apple Corps.

Restoration 
On 20 March 2012, Apple Corps announced that the film had been restored by hand for DVD and Blu-ray release on 28 May 2012 (29 May in North America), later delayed one week to 4 June 2012 (5 June in North America). The company stated: "The film's soundtrack album will be reissued on CD on the same date. The film has been restored in 4K digital resolution for the first time – all done by hand, frame by frame." The delicate restoration was supervised by Paul Rutan Jr and his team, which included Chris Dusendschon, Rayan Raghuram and Randy Walker. No automated software was used to clean up the film's repaired and digitised photo-chemical elements. The work was done by hand, a single frame at a time, by 40 to 60 trained digital artists, over several months.

In addition to the DVD and Blu-ray re-release, the restored version also received a limited theatrical run in May 2012.

For the 50th anniversary of the film, the soundtrack and score were remixed in 5.1 stereo surround sound at Abbey Road Studios by mix engineer Peter Cobbin.

Soundtrack 

On 14 September 1999, United Artists and Apple Records digitally remixed the audio of the film for a highly successful theatrical and home video re-release. Though the visuals were not digitally restored, a new transfer was done after cleaning the original film negative and rejuvenating the colour. A soundtrack album for this version was also released, which featured the first extensive digital stereo remixes of Beatles material.

The previous DVD release also featured a music-only audio track, without spoken dialogue, leaving only the music and the songs.

Awards and honours 
 1968 New York Film Critics Circle Awards Special Award
 1969 Hugo Award for Best Dramatic Presentation (nominated)
 1970 Grammy Award for Best Original Score Written for a Motion Picture or a Television Special (nominated)

Cancelled remake 
In August 2009, Variety reported that Walt Disney Pictures and filmmaker Robert Zemeckis were negotiating to produce a 3D computer-animated remake of the film. Motion capture was to be used, as with Zemeckis' previous animated films The Polar Express (2004), Monster House (2006), Beowulf (2007) and A Christmas Carol (2009). Variety also indicated that Disney hoped to release the film in time for the 2012 Summer Olympics in London. Disney and Apple Corps officially announced the remake at the inaugural D23 Expo on 11 September 2009.

Comedian Peter Serafinowicz was cast to voice Paul, Dean Lennox Kelly as John, Cary Elwes as George, Adam Campbell as Ringo and David Tennant was in talks to voice the Chief Blue Meanie. California-based Beatles tribute band The Fab Four was cast to perform the performance capture animation for the animated Beatles.

In May 2010, Disney closed Zemeckis' digital film studio ImageMovers Digital after unsatisfactory box-office performance of A Christmas Carol. On 14 March 2011, Disney abandoned the project, citing the disastrous opening weekend results of Simon Wells' Mars Needs Moms. Criticism toward motion-capture technology was also a factor.

After its cancellation at Disney, Zemeckis tried to pitch the remake to other studios. By December 2012, Zemeckis expressed that he had lost interest in the project, stating: "That would have been great to bring the Beatles back to life. But it's probably better not to be remade – you're always behind the 8-ball when do you a remake."

In 2021, footage of the remake surfaced online, revealing that the film would have potentially utilized soundbites from the original and even recreate certain scenes. One of the more notable differences was a sequence during Ringo's introduction where he was going to be tempted by a siren presumably created by the Blue Meanies.

In popular culture 

 In the 1978 mockumentary film All You Need Is Cash, the Rutles are featured in the animated film Yellow Submarine Sandwich playing their song "Cheese and Onions".
 In the 1993 episode of The Simpsons titled "Last Exit to Springfield", Lisa Simpson, under anesthetic, has a dream sequence highly reminiscent of the film.
 Professional wrestler The Blue Meanie derived his name and persona from the villains of the film.
 The 2001 episode of The Powerpuff Girls titled "Meet the Beat Alls", which contains numerous Beatles references, briefly features cameos of the band members' likenesses from Yellow Submarine. One character from the episode resembles Fred from the film.
 In the episode of the animated series Smeshariki – "BallAst", the main characters are swimming in a yellow submarine under water, as well as sounds the arrangement of the song "Yellow Submarine".
 The 2007 film Walk Hard: The Dewey Cox Story features an animated acid-trip sequence that parodies Yellow Submarine.
 The Adult Swim animated series Superjail! frequently makes visual references to Yellow Submarine, which series creator Christy Karacas has stated to be an influence to his visual style.
 The third Futurama film, Bender's Game (2008), makes visual references to Yellow Submarine.
 In the Robot Chicken episode titled "Due to Constraints of Time", Yellow Submarine is spoofed in a sketch called "Ping Them Back".
 In the 2010 episode of Family Guy titled "Something, Something, Something, Dark Side", when Lois Griffin as Princess Leia becomes angry with Peter Griffin as Han Solo  for driving the ship into an asteroid field, he says, "It was either this or the Strawberry Fields!" This leads to a cutaway gag that features the band members in their Yellow Submarine likenesses floating in the space, surrounded by giant strawberries.
 In 2010, the official music video for "Your Love Is My Drug" by American pop recording artist Ke$ha features digital animation sequences, making visual references to Yellow Submarine.
 In 2014, apparel company Vans released a series of shoes based on Yellow Submarine.
 In 2016, for the 50th anniversary of the original song's release, the die-cast toy car brand Hot Wheels released a miniature replica of the Yellow Submarine from the film, as well as an assortment of six toy cars featuring imagery from the film.
 In 2016, Lego Ideas released a Yellow Submarine Lego set that includes minifigures of the four Beatles and Jeremy Hillary Boob, along with the submarine.
 In the 2019 Marvel Cinematic Universe film Avengers: Endgame, Tony Stark jokingly refers to his shipmate Nebula as a "Blue Meanie".
 In The Big Lez Show season 3 finale, the main characters consume a plant named the "Blue Meanie", and it having a psychedelic effect. In the season 4 finale, "Choomah Island 3 - Denouement", Sassy and Donny go on a trip reminiscent of this film and encounter John Lennon.
 On 9 November 2021, a ROM hack of Super Mario Bros. 2 was released titled "The Beatles Adventures in Pepperland", which is based on the cartoon. It features the Beatles as the main protagonists instead of Mario Party and uses all classic songs in every level.

See also 

 The Beatles in film
 List of animated feature-length films
 List of fictional submarines
 List of films related to the hippie subculture

References

External links 

 
 
 
 
 Yellow Submarine movie review by Roger Ebert
 h2g2 Yellow Submarine – the Film Edited Guide Entry
 "Heinz Edelmann, 'Yellow Submarine' Artist, Dies at 75", The New York Times
 , PopMatters

The Beatles' Yellow Submarine
1968 films
1960s English-language films
1968 animated films
1960s fantasy adventure films
1968 musical comedy films
American animated fantasy films
American musical comedy films
American fantasy adventure films
British animated fantasy films
British musical comedy films
British fantasy adventure films
British independent films
British musical films
Animation based on real people
Animated musical films
British rock music films
Films about the Beatles
The Beatles in film
Cultural depictions of the Beatles
Films scored by George Martin
Films based on songs
Films set in a fictional country
Films set in Liverpool
Films shot in London
1960s musical fantasy films
Jukebox musical films
Rotoscoped films
Submarine films
Apple Films films
United Artists animated films
United Artists films
Psychedelic films
Films adapted into comics
1968 musical films
British adult animated films
1960s American films
1960s British films